The Ago Ao 192 Kurier was a small German twin-engined aircraft designed and built by AGO Flugzeugwerke in the 1930s.  A small production run of six aircraft followed three prototypes, these being used as transports.

Development and design
The AGO Flugzeugwerke was re-established at Oschersleben in 1934, with its first design a multi-purpose light-twin-engined aircraft offered against the same requirement for a light aircraft that produced the Gotha Go 146 and Siebel Fh 104.

AGO's design, the Ao 192, was a low-winged cantilever monoplane of all-metal construction. Its monocoque fuselage accommodated a crew of two pilots who sat side by side in an enclosed flight deck, while there were seats for five passengers in a separate cabin. It was powered by two 179 kW (240 hp) Argus As 10 and had a retractable tailwheel undercarriage.

The first prototype made its maiden flight in mid-1935, soon being followed by a second aircraft, similar to the first.  A third prototype, with a deeper fuselage allowing an additional passenger to be carried, more powerful engines and a revised undercarriage, formed the basis for the planned Ao 192B civil transport, with versions planned to serve as light transports, ambulance aircraft and survey aircraft.  In addition, a number of military variants were proposed, including a light reconnaissance aircraft and a light bomber.

AGO had large orders for licence-built aircraft for the Luftwaffe however, with much of their wartime work involved with Focke-Wulf, and only six AGO production aircraft could be built.

Operational history

The six production aircraft were acquired by the German state, with one being used as the personal transport of Dr Robert Ley, the head of the Reichsarbeitdienst, while others were used as transports by the Waffen-SS and at the test-centre at Rechlin.

Variants
Ao 192 V1
First prototype. Argus As 10 C engines.
Ao 192 V2
Second prototype, revised, braced, tailplane.
Ao 192 V3
Third prototype. Argus As 10E engines, revised fuselage and undercarriage.
Ao 192B
Production series based on V3. Six built.

Specifications (Ao 192B)

See also

Notes

References

"Plane Facts". Air International, June 1977, Vol 12 No 6. p. 306.
Smith, J.R. and Kay, Antony J. German Aircraft of the Second World War. London: Putnam, 1990. .

External links

AGO Ao 192
 Ago Ao 192 "Kurier" - In Polish

1930s German civil utility aircraft
Low-wing aircraft
Aircraft first flown in 1935
Twin piston-engined tractor aircraft
Ao 192